The British Journal of Dermatology is a monthly peer-reviewed medical journal that covers the field of dermatology. It is published by Wiley-Blackwell on behalf of the British Association of Dermatologists. The journal was established in 1888 and the editor-in-chief is John Ingram. According to the Journal Citation Reports, the journal has a 2020 impact factor of 9.3., ranked third within the dermatology subject category.

It was edited from 1896 to 1904 by Sir James Galloway.

References

External links 
 
 British Association of Dermatologists

Publications established in 1888
English-language journals
Monthly journals
Wiley-Blackwell academic journals
Dermatology journals
Health in the London Borough of Camden
Academic journals associated with learned and professional societies of the United Kingdom